Blain Supply, Inc., doing business as Blain's Farm & Fleet, is a regional chain of 44 retail stores in Wisconsin, Illinois, Iowa and Michigan. The stores sell tires, agricultural supplies and equipment, hunting and fishing equipment and licenses, kitchen appliances, housewares, automotive goods, men's & women's clothing, household hardware, lawn and garden supplies, outdoor power tools, pumps and generators, paint, pet supplies, candy, sporting goods, tools and toys. Blain's Farm & Fleet was an early adopter of "buy online, pick up at the store" in which all stores provide a drive-thru pick-up experience so online orders can be retrieved without consumers having to leave the car.

History

The company was founded in Janesville, Wisconsin, in 1955 by brothers W. C. "Claude" Blain and N. A. "Bert" Blain. Similarly-named Mills Fleet Farm was also founded in 1955 by Blain family friends. The two families agreed to use similar names and have historically operated in different territories. Each Blain's retail store is part of Farm and Fleet Stores which operate in four divisions by region, while the distribution is handled by a separate entity, Blain Supply. The business is family-owned, privately held corporation run by President and CEO Jane Blain Gilbertson since her brother, Robert Blain, retired in 2014. Robert had been President since 1993, taking over after the death of Bert Blain. The chain has one distribution center in Janesville. In January 2018, the company announced it would be expanding into Michigan with 5 stores located in Portage, Jackson, Traverse City, Holland and Walker.

References

External links 

Farm and ranch supply stores of the United States
Retail companies established in 1955
Companies based in Wisconsin
Janesville, Wisconsin
1955 establishments in Wisconsin
Agriculture companies established in 1955
American companies established in 1955
Family-owned companies of the United States